Doun Kaev municipality is a municipality (krong) in Takeo province, in southern Cambodia.

Krong Doun Kaev was renamed from Doun Kaev district in accordance with Sub-Decree No. 226  dated 30 December 2008.

Administrative divisions 
As of 2019, Krong Doun Kaev has three sangkats (quarters) and 40 villages.

References

 
Districts of Takéo province